Association of Bihar Cricket or ABC is a parallel cricket governing body for the cricket activities in the Bihar state of India. It is not recognized by the  Board of Control for Cricket in India.

History

It was formed in 2010 when BJP MP and former test cricketer Kirti Azad jumped into it with his own Association of Bihar Cricket.  Azad has attacked Bihar Cricket Association chief Lalu Prasad Yadav accusing him of ruining cricket in the state by running the BCA in an arbitrary manner.

In July 2012, Association of Bihar Cricket had charged the Lalu Prasad Yadav-led Bihar Cricket Association of committing financial irregularities to the tune of INR5 million, which the BCCI had granted for development of the game in the state in 2008. The Bihar government had dissolved the BCA on grounds of irregularities in December 2008.

In October 2012, singer Manoj Tiwari was elected the President of Association of Bihar Cricket.

Officials

 Manoj Tiwari - President 
 Sabir Ali - Senior Vice-president 
 Narendra Kumar Singh - Vice-president 
 Anil Kumar Singh - Vice-president 
 Nitin Kumar Yadav - Vice-president 
 Mithilesh Tiwari - General Secretary
 Anand Dwivede - Treasurer

See also

 Bihar Cricket Association
 Bihar cricket team

References

External links

 Tiwari seeks BCCI affiliation

Bihar
Cricket
Sports organizations established in 2010
2010 establishments in Bihar